"Heaven's What I Feel" is a 1998 song by Cuban American singer and songwriter Gloria Estefan, released as the lead single from her eighth studio album, gloria! on May 5, 1998 by Epic Records. The song was written by Kike Santander originally for Celine Dion. It was produced by Emilio Estefan, Jr. and Santander. The song is an up-tempo dance-pop, house and dance song.

The single was a hit in Europe, the US, Australia and Japan. In Spain, it peaked at number-one. It also reached the Top 5 in Hungary and Top 20 in Scotland and the UK. In the US, the song reached number 27 on the Billboard Hot 100 and number 7 on the Hot Dance Music/Club Play chart. Estefan performed "Heaven's What I Feel" at many TV-concerts and shows, like the 1998 VH1 Divas Live, Top of the Pops and the 1998 World Music Awards.

The song was nominated for the Grammy Award for Best Dance Recording but lost to Madonna's smash hit "Ray of Light". The music video for the song, directed by Bille Woodruff, received an ALMA Award for "Best Outstanding Video".

Song history
The song was written by Colombian-American composer Kike Santander. It was first recorded by Canadian singer Celine Dion, but she did not feel it was right for her fifth English album Let's Talk About Love (1997), so the song was given to Estefan. Santander co-produced it with Estefan's husband, Emilio Estefan, Jr. It was recorded in three languages: English, Spanish and French and was made available on May 5, 1998 by Epic Records. The Spanish version titled "Corazón Prohibido" ("Forbidden Heart") was released as a single in Spain, where it topped the charts. The French version titled "Amour Infini" ("Endless Love") was only available on the Canadian and the French album releases, and on the European Limited Edition 2-Disc release of the gloria! album.

On June 3, 2022, Estefan released the "Heaven's What I Feel" EP and its Spanish version "Corazón Prohibido" EP  to all digital and streaming outlets.
The single received massive promotion. Estefan first performed the song at the 1998 VH1 Divas Live; she also performed at Studio 54 in New York City. Then she sang it again at the 1998 World Music Awards in Monaco where she was the hostess of the event. It was performed on many television programs around the world, such as the British music chart television program Top of the Pops. 
The B-side of the single is the "Gloria Hitmix", a megamix which includes the songs: "I'm Not Giving You Up", "Reach", "You'll Be Mine (Party Time)", "Mi Tierra", "Live for Loving You", "Tres Deseos", "Everlasting Love" and "Turn the Beat Around."

Critical reception
Ben Wener from Beaver County Times noted "the lush orchestration" of the song in his review of gloria!. Larry Flick from Billboard described it as a "deliciously sweet confection that takes the listener back to the days of disco with its wonderfully vibrant strings and rumbling percussion." He added, "La G is in exceptional voice here, hitting high notes she's never touched before—and doing so with a delightfully romantic flair. The fingerprints of top clubland producer Tony Moran are all over the track, starting with its muscular bassline and unabashedly gleeful keyboards." He also noted that the song has "cute lyrics and instantly sing-along chorus." Another editor, Chuck Taylor deemed it as a "tasty" track. The Daily Vault's Alfredo Narvaez called it a "flamboyant" song, and stated that it is "pretty enough to be liked by teenage girls and danceable enough that older ladies will instantly recognize and like its vibe."

Dave Sholin from the Gavin Report viewed it as "upbeat with a great hook" and a "winner". He added that "while some of her strongest hits have been ballads, it's wonderful to hear her pick up the pace on this latest endeavor." Joey Guerra from Houston Chronicle wrote that it is a "daring, delightful track" that "takes flight on the wings of its rousing chorus and themes of unexpected love." Jeremy Griffin from The Ithacan described it as "sensational". A reviewer from Music & Media commented that with this track, Estefan "yet again comes up with a near-perfect pop/dance crossover hit. The song has the hook to make it a radio favourite, and a couple of snappy remixes should help broaden its appeal." Gerald Martinez from New Sunday Times wrote that it "grooves to a latin disco beat of the 70s and 80s". Victoria Segal from NME said songs like "Heaven's What I Feel" "speak the international language of tedium". Larry Flick for Vibe noted its "twinkly synths, romantic live strings, and vibrant house bass line".

"Heaven's What I Feel" was successful in Europe, Japan, and the US. It peaked at number 27 on the Billboard Hot 100 and number 7 on the Hot Dance Music/Club Play chart. In Europe, the single reached the Top 5 in Hungary, Top 20 in Scotland and the UK, and Top 40 in Belgium and Switzerland.

Music video
The music video was directed by American film director Bille Woodruff. It was filmed in a "space" style and shows Gloria flying in some scenes. The video begins with Gloria standing alone singing in front of a magical green portal. As the chorus begins, she goes through it and ends up flying along a rotating tunnel with flashing lights. As the second verse begins, Gloria ends up in a club, amidst dancing people in several floors. Along the walls are screens with Estefan singing. She also performs choreography with some of the dancers. Towards the end, she is lifted up as she continues to sing. After she sings the last note of the song, everyone in the club claps for her. The video received the ALMA Award for "Best Outstanding Video". Two similar videos were created, one for the English version and one for the Spanish version.

Usage in media
The song was included in the movie Dance with Me (starring Vanessa L. Williams and Chayanne) soundtrack.

Charts

"Heaven's What I Feel"

"Corazón Prohibido"

Formats and track listings

"Heaven's What I Feel"

"Corazón Prohibido"

Release history

Official versions and remixes
Original versions
 Album Version — (5:05)
 Radio Edit #1 — (4:37)
 Radio Edit #2 — (4:07)
 Ballad Version — (4:28)
 Acappella — (4:26)
 Spanish Version ("Corazón Prohibido") — (5:05)
 Spanish Radio Edit ("Corazón Prohibido") — (4:34)
 Spanish Ballad Version ("Corazón Prohibido") — (5:05)
 Spanish Acappella  ("Corazón Prohibido") — (4:31)
 French Version ("Amour Infini") — (5:05)

"Heaven's What I Feel" remixes
 Pablo Flores Remix — (5:03)
 Love To Infinity Classic Paradise Mix — (6:10)
 Love To Infinity Classic Radio Mix #1 (a.k.a. Classic Radio Long) — (5:05) 
 Love To Infinity Classic Radio Edit #2 (a.k.a. Classic Radio Short) — (3:32)
 Love To Infinity Rhino Mix — (7:11)
 Victor Calderone Mix — (8:32)
 Victor Calderone Radio Mix — (4:12)
 Victor Calderone Dub — (7:30)
 Soul Solution Vox Mix — (10:11)
 Soul Solution Radio Mix — (4:40)
 Soul Solution NRG Dub — (5:12)
 Trouser Enthusiasts' Neanderthal Thrust Mix — (10:54)
 Prince Quick Mix's Amped Up Pass — (5:40)
 Prince Quick Mix's Subaquatic Dub — (6:15)

"Corazón Prohibido" remixes
 Pablo Flores Remix — (4:42)
 Pablo Flores Spanish 12" Remix — (7:10)

References

1998 songs
1998 singles
Gloria Estefan songs
Dance-pop songs
Epic Records singles
House music songs
Music videos directed by Bille Woodruff
Number-one singles in Spain
Songs written by Kike Santander